The Cambodian Civil War was a conflict between the forces of the Communist Party of Kampuchea (the Khmer Rouge) and the royal forces of the Kingdom of Cambodia from 1967 to 1970, then between the National United Front of Kampuchea and the Khmer Republic from 1970 to 1975.

Khmer Republic Equipment

Handguns

M1911 pistol
Browning Hi-Power
Smith & Wesson Model 39
M1917 revolver
Smith & Wesson Model 10

Submachine guns

M1A1 Thompson submachine gun
M3A1 submachine gun
MAT-49

Assault rifles

M16A1 Standard FANK issue rifle
CAR-15 Used by special forces
AKM Used extensively in swamp and jungle environment
AKMS Used extensively in swamp and jungle environment
AK-47 Used extensively in swamp and jungle environment
AKS-47 Used extensively in swamp and jungle environment 
Type 56 assault rifle Captured from Communist forces
Type 56-I assault rifle Captured from Communist forces

Carbines
M1/ M2 Carbine
SKS Used extensively in swamp and jungle environment
Type 56 Carbine Captured from Communist forces

Battle rifles

M1 Garand
FN FAL Received limited quantities. Used in small number
Heckler & Koch G3 Received limited quantities

Bolt-action rifles

M1903 Springfield
MAS-36
Lee–Enfield Used in small number

Shotguns

Ithaca 37 pump-action

Light machine guns

M1918A2 Browning Automatic Rifle
FM 24/29
Bren Used in small number
DPM 
RPD

General-purpose machine gun

M60 machine gun Standard FANK issue machine gun
M60B/M60D machine gun Used on the UH-1 helicopters
M1919A6 Browning machine gun

Heavy machine guns
M2 Browning machine gun, cal. .50, HB Used on the M113
M1917 Browning machine gun In limited service
M1919A4 Browning machine gun
SG-43/SGM Goryunov Captured from Communist forces

Anti-tank rocket launchers

M72 LAW Standard FANK issue rocket launchers
M202 FLASH Used in small number
RPG-2 
RPG-7 
Type 56 RPG Captured from Communist forces
Type 69 RPG Captured from Communist forces

Recoilless rifles
M20 recoilless rifle
M40 recoilless rifle
M67 recoilless rifle
B-10 recoilless rifle
B-11 recoilless rifle

Grenade launchers

M79 grenade launcher Standard FANK issue grenade launcher
M203 grenade launcher Used on the M16A1 rifle

Grenades and mines

M67 grenade Standard FANK issue frag grenade
M61 grenade frag grenade
Mk 2 grenade frag grenade 
AN M18 smoke grenade
M34 white phosphorus grenade smoke grenade
Claymore M18A1 anti-personnel mine
M16 mine bounding anti-personnel mine

Anti-aircraft guns

Bofors 40mm anti-aircraft gun
S-60 57mm anti-aircraft gun
Type 55/65 37mm anti-aircraft gun Chinese variant of M1939 (61-K)

Mortars

Brandt Mle 27/31
M19 mortar
M29 mortar
M30 107 mm mortar
M2 4.2 inch mortar

Howitzers

M101 105 mm howitzer
M102 105 mm howitzer
M114 155 mm howitzer
M116 howitzer
M109 155mm self-propelled gun Used in small number
Type 59-1 130mm field gun

Land vehicles

 Gun Jeep, 1/4-ton with mounted M60 machine gun or Browning M1919A4
M151 Truck, Utility, 1/4-Ton, 4×4
M35 Cargo truck
GMC C7500 heavy-duty truck
M113 armored personnel carrier
AMX-13 Light tank
M24 Chaffee Light tank
Howitzer Motor Carriage M8
M8 Greyhound armoured car
Panhard AML
BTR-40
BTR-152

Helicopters
UH-1 Iroquois gunship
UH-1H transport
Sikorsky H-34 transport

Aircraft
MiG-17 fighter jet
Shenyang J-5 fighter jet
C-47 transport
Fairchild C-123 Provider transport
AC-47D gunship
AU-24A mini-gunship
North American T-28 Trojan trainer/fighter-bomber
Potez CM.170R Fouga Magister jet trainer/fighter-bomber
Cessna T-37B jet trainer/fighter-bomber
Cessna T-41 Mescalero trainer
Cessna O-1D Bird Dog reconnaissance/observation light aircraft
U-1A Otter liaison aircraft

Naval craft
 Monitor, (MON) heavily gunned riverine craft
 Swift Boat, (PCF) Patrol Craft Fast
 Assault Support Patrol Boat, (ASPB) also known as Alpha boats
 PBR, Patrol Boat River, (all fiberglass boats, propelled by twin water jets)
 Landing Craft Mechanized

Khmer Rouge Equipment

Handguns
Makarov pistol
Tokarev TT-33
Type 54 pistol Chinese variant of TT-33

Submachine guns

MAT-49
vz. 24, 26
PPSh-41, K-50M
PPS-43

Shotguns
IZH-43 double barrel shotgun

Assault rifles
AK-47
AKM
Type 56 assault rifle Used extensively
Type 56-I assault rifle Used extensively
Type 58 assault rifle 
Type 63 assault rifle Used in small number
Sa vz. 58 Used in small number
M16A1 rifle Captured from government forces

Carbines
SKS
Type 56 carbine Used extensively
M1/ M2 Carbine Captured from government forces

Bolt-action rifles
 
Mosin–Nagant
Type 53 carbine
MAS-36
Arisaka rifle Used in small number

Light machine guns

RPD
Type 56 LMG Chinese variant of RPD. Used extensively
RPK
DP/DPM
Type 53 Chinese variant of DPM.
M1918A2 BAR Captured from government forces

General-purpose machine guns
PK/PKM Used in small number
Degtyaryov RP-46
M60 Captured from government forces

Heavy machine guns

Type 53/57 Chinese variant of SG-43 and SGM
DShK
Type 54 Chinese variant of DShKM
KPV
M1919A4 Browning machine gun Captured from government forces

Anti-tank rocket launchers

RPG-2 Used extensively
RPG-7
Type 56 RPG Used extensively
Type 69 RPG Used extensively

Anti-aircraft guns

57 mm AZP S-60 Used in small number
Type 59 57 mm anti-aircraft gun Chinese variant of S-60, Used in small number
ZPU-1/2/4
37 mm automatic air defense gun M1939 (61-K) Used in small number
Type 55/65 37 mm anti-aircraft gun Chinese variant of M1939 (61-K), Used in small number

Mortar
Type 53 82 mm
82-PM-41
Type 55 12 0mm

Artillery

Khmer Rouge used small number of field howitzers or captured howitzers from government forces
76 mm divisional gun M1942 (ZiS-3)
85 mm divisional gun D-44
T-12 100mm anti-tank gun
Type 60 122 mm Field Gun
Type 59-1 130mm field gun Used in small number
Zis 3

Recoilless rifles

B-10 recoilless rifle
B-11 recoilless rifle
Type 56 recoilless rifle
Type 65 recoilless rifle

Grenade launchers
M79 Captured from government forces

Tanks and other vehicles

 T-54/55
 Type 59
 Type 62
 Type 63 (tank)

See also
 Weapons of the Laotian Civil War
 Weapons of the Vietnam War

Notes

References
Albert Grandolini, Armor of the Vietnam War (2): Asian Forces, Concord Publications, Hong Kong 1998. 
Bernard C. Nalty, Jacob Neufeld and George M. Watson, An Illustrated Guide to the Air War over Vietnam, Salamander Books Ltd, London 1982.  
Bill Gunston, An Illustrated Guide to Military Helicopters, Salamander Books Ltd, London 1981.  
Kenneth Conboy and Kenneth Bowra, The War in Cambodia 1970–75, Men-at-arms series 209, Osprey Publishing Ltd, London 1989. 
Michael Green & Peter Sarson, Armor of the Vietnam War (1): Allied Forces, Concord Publications, Hong Kong 1996. 

Cambodia history-related lists
Cambodian Civil War
Cambodian military-related lists
Vietnam War-related lists
Cambodian Civil War